The Museum Computer Network (MCN) is a US-based non-profit organization for professionals with an interest in the use of computer technology for museums.

Overview
MCN was established in 1967 in the New York City area. The history of MCN spans a period during which information technology developed at an exponential pace. The organization began as an informal grouping of museums with the goal of automating registration records. With funding from the New York Council on the Arts, MCN developed a prototype mainframe network that was shared by participants from 1968 to 1971. When the funding ended in 1971, MCN was formally incorporated as a nonprofit organization that has since attracted members from around the world. As new technology superseded the original shared registration system, MCN evolved into a network of professionals wishing to improve their means of developing, managing, and conveying museum information through the use of automation.
MCN organizes an annual conference, the MCN-L discussion forum, special interest groups, an online directory of museum websites, etc. Members include individuals, institutions and companies. The organization is run by a Board of Directors. Officers include a president, vice-president, secretary and treasurer.

Conference
MCN has held an annual conference since 1979. 
Recent Conferences:
2015 in Minneapolis, Minnesota, November 4–7, 2015, with the title of The Invisible Architectures of Connected Museums.
2014 in Dallas, Texas with the title of Think Big, Start Small, Create.
2013 in Montreal, Canada with the title of Re:making Museums
2012 in Seattle, Washington with the title of Shifting Perspective, Evolving Spaces, Disruptive Technologies
2011 in Atlanta, Georgia with the title of Hacking the Museum: Innovation, Agility and Collaboration
2010 in Austin, Texas with the title of I/O: The Museum Inside-out/Outside-in
Complete list of MCN Conferences

Spectra
MCN published Spectra, established in 1974. For example, the Computer Interchange of Museum Information (CIMI) Standards Framework was published in Spectra.

See also
 Museums Computer Group, United Kingdom
 Museum informatics
 Everett Ellin

References

External links
 MCN website
 Museum Sites Online
 Mustech Central, MCN Project Registry

1967 establishments in New York (state)
Information technology organizations based in North America
Museum informatics
Museum organizations
Museums in the United States
Non-profit organizations based in Washington, D.C.
Organizations established in 1967